The Audi Type G is a passenger car produced by Audi between 1914 and 1923. It is Audi's smallest and least powerful pre-war car.

Power was transmitted to the rear wheels through a four-speed countershaft gearbox and a steel propeller shaft. A top speed of 65 km/h (40 mph) was claimed. The mechanical foot brake worked directly on the propeller shaft. The car had a ladder frame and two leaf-sprung solid axles. It was available as a sports two-seater.

1,122 Type G Audis were built, making this the biggest selling Audi prior to the creation, in 1932, of the Auto Union.

Specifications

Sources
 
 

Type G
Cars introduced in 1914
1920s cars